BAG family molecular chaperone regulator 3 is a protein that in humans is encoded by the BAG3 gene. BAG3 is involved in chaperone-assisted selective autophagy.

Function 

BAG proteins compete with Hip-1 for binding to the Hsc70/Hsp70 ATPase domain and promote substrate release. All the BAG proteins have an approximately 45-amino acid BAG domain near the C terminus but differ markedly in their N-terminal regions. The protein encoded by this gene contains a WW domain in the N-terminal region and a BAG domain in the C-terminal region. The BAG domains of BAG1, BAG2, and BAG3 interact specifically with the Hsc70 ATPase domain in vitro and in mammalian cells. All 3 proteins bind with high affinity to the ATPase domain of Hsc70 and inhibit its chaperone activity in a Hip-repressible manner.

Clinical significance 

BAG gene has been implicated in age related neurodegenerative diseases such as Alzheimer's. It has been demonstrated that BAG1 and BAG3 regulate the proteasomal and lysosomal protein elimination pathways, respectively. It has also been shown to be a cause of familial dilated cardiomyopathy.
That BAG3 mutations are responsible for familial dilated cardiomyopathy is confirmed by another study describing 6 new molecular variants (2 missense and 4 premature Stops
). Moreover, the same publication reported that BAG3 polymorphisms are also associated with sporadic forms of the disease together with HSPB7 locus.

In muscle cells, BAG3 cooperates with the molecular chaperones Hsc70 and HspB8 to induce the degradation of mechanically damaged cytoskeleton components in lysosomes. This process is called chaperone-assisted selective autophagy and is essential for maintaining muscle activity in flies, mice and men.

BAG3 is able to stimulate the expression of cytoskeleton proteins in response to mechanical tension by activating the transcription regulators YAP1 and WWTR1. BAG3 balances protein synthesis and protein degradation under mechanical stress.

Interactions 

PLCG1 has been shown to interact with:

 FGFR1, 
 CD117, 
 CD31, 
 Cbl gene 
CISH
 Epidermal growth factor receptor, 
 Eukaryotic translation elongation factor 1 alpha 1, 
 FLT1, 
 GAB1, 
 GIT1, 
 Grb2, 
 HER2/neu, 
 IRS2, 
 ITK, 
 KHDRBS1, 
 Linker of activated T cells, 
 Lymphocyte cytosolic protein 2, 
 PDGFRA, 
 PLD2, 
 RHOA, 
 SOS1,
 TUB, 
 TrkA, 
 TrkB, 
 VAV1,  and
 Wiskott-Aldrich syndrome protein.

References

Further reading

External links 
  GeneReviews/NIH/NCBI/UW entry on Myofibrillar Myopathy
 
 

Ageing
Aging-related genes
Aging-related proteins
Co-chaperones